Hedda Ødegaard (born 7 January 1995) is a Norwegian tennis player. She won the Norway National Tennis Championships in 2011 both singles and doubles.

Junior career

ITF junior finals

Singles (1–2)

Doubles (3–0)

National representation

Fed Cup
Ødegaard made her Fed Cup debut for Norway in 2010, while the team was competing in the Europe/Africa Zone Group II, when she was 15 years and 113 days old.

Fed Cup (3–10)

Singles (2–5)

Doubles (1–5)

References

External links
 
 
 

1995 births
Living people
Norwegian female tennis players
People from Lillestrøm
Sportspeople from Viken (county)
21st-century Norwegian women